This is a list of diplomatic missions of Vanuatu. The Pacific island state of Vanuatu only has nine diplomatic missions abroad.

Asia

 Beijing (Embassy)
 Hong Kong (Consulate-General)
 Shanghai (Consulate-General)

 Manila (Consulate-General)

Europe

 Brussels (Embassy)

 Nouméa, New Caledonia (Consulate-General)

Oceania

 Canberra (High Commission)

 Suva (High Commission)

 Wellington (High Commission)
 Auckland (Consulate-General)

Multilateral organisations
 
 New York City (Permanent Mission)

See also
 Foreign relations of Vanuatu
 Visa policy of Vanuatu

References

Foreign relations of Vanuatu
Diplomatic missions
Vanuatu